Carol Davila University of Medicine and Pharmacy or University of Medicine and Pharmacy Bucharest, commonly known by the abbreviation UMFCD, is a public health sciences university in Bucharest, Romania. It is one of the largest and oldest institutions of its kind in Romania. The university uses the facilities of over 20 clinical hospitals all over Bucharest.

The Carol Davila University is classified as an "advanced research and education university" by the Ministry of Education. Created as part of the University of Bucharest in 1869, the institution is considered one of the most prestigious of its kind in Romania and in Eastern Europe.

Library 

The university includes two major libraries, both built in 1869 in a neoclassical and neo-baroque style.

History

Carol Davila was a prestigious Romanian physician of Italian ancestry. He studied medicine at the University of Paris, graduating in February 1853. In March 1853, he arrived in Romania. He was the organiser of the military medical service for the Romanian Army and of the country's public health system.

In 1857, Davila, in collaboration with Nicolae Crețulescu, founded the university, at which time it was known under the name of the National School of Medicine and Pharmacy. In the same year, the foundation stone of the University Palace in Bucharest was laid. It was due to Carol Davila's many activities that several scientific associations appeared in Romania: the Medical Society (1857), the Red Cross Society (1876), and the Natural Sciences Society (1876). With his assistance, two medical journals entered print: the Medical Register (1862) and the Medical Gazette (1865).

On 12 November 1869, it was established the Faculty of Medicine of Bucharest, incorporated in the University of Bucharest. The first doctoral degrees were granted in 1873, and the doctoral degree became the de facto graduation in 1888.

The Nobel Prize in Physiology or Medicine was awarded to George Emil Palade, described as "the most influential cell biologist ever", who had studied at the University of Carol Davila and later served as a Professor and Head of the Department of Human Biology and Physiology.

The School of Pharmacy was founded in 1889 as part of the Faculty of Medicine. In 1923, it was separated and it became the Faculty of Pharmacy.

The Faculty of Pharmacy of Carol Davila University is the place where insulin was isolated for the first time by Nicolae Paulescu in 1921, leading to a controversy in the awarding of the 1923 Nobel Prize in physiology or medicine.

In 1948, the Faculties of Medicine and Pharmacy were separated from the University of Bucharest, and incorporated as the Institute of Medicine and Pharmacy. In the same year, the postgraduate Clinical Dentistry Institute was incorporated into the Institute of Medicine and Pharmacy as the Faculty of Dentistry.

In 1991, the Institute of Medicine and Pharmacy changed its name to the Carol Davila University of Medicine and Pharmacy.

Ranking

According to the Scimago Lab, based on data collected between 2007 and 2011, Carol Davila University of Medicine and Pharmacy ranked 121 regionally and 12 in the country by number of publications. According to the International Journal of Medical Sciences, in a 2019 survey UMFCD along with Karolinska Institute, Erasmus University, and Paris Descartes University are considered Europe's medical universities that are leading change. Based on the Shanghai Ranking, the Carol Davila University of Medicine and Pharmacy lies among  the top 151–200 Universities in the “medical sciences” domain with regards to the subject "clinical medicine”.

Faculties
 Faculty of Medicine
 Faculty of Pharmacy
 Faculty of Dentistry

Faculty of Medicine

The higher medical and pharmaceutical education in Bucharest dates back more than a century. Carol Davila, a Romanian physician of Italian origin, in collaboration with Nicholae Kretzulescu founded the Medical education in Romania, by establishing the National School of Medicine and Pharmacy in 1857. Thanks to his activity a number of scientific societies were created, such as the Medical Society, the Red Cross Society and the Natural Sciences Society, and two medical journals, The Medical Monitor and The Medical Gazette.

The building of the Faculty of Medicine was fully completed and inaugurated on 12 October 1903.
The initiative to erect a monument to Carol Davila on the same day, was taken at the first national medical conference, which was held in Bucharest in October 1884. The statue, valued work of Carol Storck, was cast in bronze in the School of arts and crafts workshops in Bucharest.

The inauguration of the faculty building is an important date in the evolution of medical education in Bucharest. The new building brought great improvements in the functioning of laboratories and the organization of practical work, as well as in the full didactic activity. In the faculty building there is a fully organized sports center that includes an autonomous indoor swimming pool for the university's representative successful team and in addition an indoor basketball, volleyball and handball court.

Departments

 Pathophysiology and Immunology
 Genetics
 Internal Medicine and Nephrology
 Internal Medicine and Gastroenterology
 Internal Medicine and Rheumatology
 Medical Expertise and Work Capacity Recovery
 Internal Medicine
 Cardiology
 Internal Medicine and Cardiology
 Allergology
 Medical - Surgical Care Practice
 General Nursing
 Neuro - Psychomotor Children Recovery
 Recovery, Physical Education, Balneology
 Family Medicine
 Endocrinology
 Biochemistry
 Medical Informatics and Biostatistics
 History of Medicine
 Marketing and Medical Technology
 Legal Medicine and Bioethics
 Cardiovascular Surgery
 Thoracic Surgery
 Dermatology
 Oncological Dermatology and Allergology
 Hygiene and Medical Ecology
 Public Health and Management
 Diabetes, Nutrition and Metabolic Diseases
 Geriatrics and Gerontology
 Pneumophysiology
 Anesthesia and Intensive Therapy
 Surgery
 Neurosurgery
 General and Esophageal Surgery
 Anesthesia and Intensive Therapy
 Pharmacology, Toxicology and Clinical Psychopharmacology
 Nephrology
 Urology
 Urological Surgery
 Transplantation Immunology
 Orthopaedics
 Orthopaedics and Traumatology
 Plastic and Reconstructive Surgery
 Plastic Surgery, Children Reconstructive Surgery
 Pediatric Neurology
 Occupational Medicine
 Child and Adolescent Psychiatry
 Medical Psychology
 Infectious and Tropical Diseases
 Virusology
 Epidemiology
 Microbiology
 Parasitology
 Obstetrics and Gynecology
 Hematology
 Pediatrics
 O.R.L.
 Ophthalmology
 Radiology, Medical Imaging, Nuclear Medicine
 Oncology
 Radiotherapy and Oncology
 Biophysics
 Cellular and Molecular Medicine
 Pharmacology and Pharmacotherapy
 Anatomy
 Psychiatry
 Pathological Anatomy

Faculty of Pharmacy

The Faculty of Pharmacy was created in 1858.

Departments

 Analytical Chemistry
 Inorganic Chemistry
 Medications Control
 Organic Chemistry
 Clinical Laboratory
 Medical Emergency
 Botanic Pharmacy and Cellular Biology
 Clinical Pharmacy
 Phytochemistry and Phytotherapy
 Biochemistry
 General and Pharmaceutical Microbiology
 Toxicology
 Medical Pedagogy
 Technical Pharmaceutics

Faculty of Dentistry

Departments

 Clinical and Topografic Anatomy
 Anatomy and Embryology
 Internal Medicine
 Paediatrics
 Neurology
 O.R.L.
 Ophthalmology
 Surgery and Anesthesiology
 Obstetrics
 Pathologic Anatomy
 Infectious Diseases
 Dermatology
 Endocrinology
 Pathophysiology and Immunology
 Hygiene

Notable alumni
 Aurel Babeș (1886–1962), Romanian scientist, one of the discoverers of the screening test for cervical cancer
 Sorin Lavric (born 1967), Romanian writer, philosopher and politician
 Mina Minovici (1858–1933), Romanian forensic scientist
 Filip Mișea (1873–1944), Aromanian activist, physician and politician
 George Emil Palade (1912–2008), 1974 Nobel Prize in Physiology or Medicine and United States National Medal of Science in 1986
 Nicolae Paulescu (1869–1931), Romanian physiologist, professor of medicine, politician, discovered insulin

References

External links
 Official site

 
Medical schools in Romania
Educational institutions established in 1857
1857 establishments in the Ottoman Empire